The Argentine Submarine Force Command (Spanish: Comando de la Fuerza de Submarinos, COFS) is the submarine service branch of the Argentine Navy. Argentine submarines have traditionally been named after the provinces of the Republic whose name begins with the letter 'S'; they are home based at Mar del Plata Naval Base. COFS members have the same rank insignia and titles as the rest of the Navy. As of 2010, the elite group Agrupación de Buzos Tácticos is under the direct command of the submarine force. After the disappearance of ARA San Juan in November 2017, one  and one Type 209 submarines remain on the naval list, though neither is operational.

Like the rest of the Argentine armed services, the submarine force has been struggling to maintain its readiness due to budget constraints affecting equipment maintenance and personnel training. In 2012, the three boats then in service had maintenance difficulties and between them spent just 19 hours submerged.

Since mid-2019, the governments of Brazil and Argentina have been working on a transfer deal for the four Tupi IKL209/1400 submarines currently operated by the Brazilian Navy. In the early 2000s they were upgraded with new combat systems by Lockheed Martin Maritime Systems and Sensors. This gave the submarines the ability to carry and fire the Mk 48 Mod 6AT ADCAP Torpedo. Defence ministers and admirals of the Argentine Navy were enthusiastic about moving forward with the arrangement. The submarines were to be repaired and serviced in the Tandanor drydock facility. The acquisition would rejuvenate the Argentine submarine force and its strategic position in the South Atlantic. In January 2020, while touring the Mar del Plata naval base, Defence Minister Augustin Rossi indicated that he was anxious to ensure that the submarine capability provided by ARA Santa Cruz (the last submarine then remaining active in Argentine service) would not be lost. 

However, by the end of 2020, the refit of Santa Cruz was reported cancelled leaving the entire Argentine submarine service inactive. The submarine service was relying on international exchanges to permit personnel to serve in foreign submarines (notably with the Peruvian Navy) and was using the submarine Salta as a training platform at dockside.

History 

In 1917 the Argentine Navy sent students to the United States to begin training courses at the Naval Submarine Base New London. Lieutenants Francis Lajous, Osvaldo Repeto, Eduardo Ceballos and Vicente Ferrer served in the United States Navy during the First World War.

First generation 

In 1927 the Argentine Navy signed a contract with the Italian shipyard Franco Tosi of Taranto in order to build the service's first three ships. The units arrived in Buenos Aires on 7 April 1933, and transferred to Mar del Plata on 3 September, which became the Anniversary Day for the newly created Submarine Force. The Tarantinos, as they were known, served between 1933 and 1960 when the last one, Santa Fe (S-1), was retired after taking over a thousand dives. In 1938, the crew of Santa Fe had been awarded a civilian medal after assisting a local fishing boat that was in distress off Cabo Corrientes. Santiago del Estero (S-2) established (at the time) an immersion record for a submarine in the South Atlantic (114 metres).  Santiago del Estero took part in the blockade of the Rio de la Plata during the 1955 Revolución Libertadora, where she fought off a strike package of Gloster Meteor fighter aircraft loyal to president Juan Domingo Peron.

 ARA Santa Fe (S-1)
 ARA Santiago del Estero (S-2)
 ARA Salta (S-3)

Second generation 

In April 1960 the United States Navy agreed to transfer two  units on loan under the Military Assistance Program. They departed from San Francisco, California, on September 23 and arrived in Mar del Plata on November 30. These ships participated in numerous exercises during their career including UNITAS, CAIMAN, SAYONARA and CAIO DULIO. The conning towers of both submarines were locally upgraded to improve hydrodynamics. In 1996, Argentinian officials disclosed that a group of tactical divers had carried out an incursion on the Falkland Islands on board Santiago del Estero (S-12) in October 1966. The submarines went back to the United States for mid-life repairs and were retired in 1971.

 , ex 
 , ex

Third generation 

In 1971 the US Navy transferred further units in order to replace the previous generation. Two GUPPY-type submarines were an interim measure until new submarines being built in Europe became available. Santiago del Estero was retired by September 1981 but ARA Santa Fe (S-21) would take part in the 1982 Falklands War. She landed a team of Buzos Tácticos (tactical divers) on the initial amphibious assault and weeks later, after a successful resupply mission, was spotted on the surface. She was attacked with AS 12 missiles by a British Wasp helicopter and disabled off Grytviken, South Georgia; scuttled at dock by her crew, the submarine was eventually sunk in deep waters by the British some years after the war ended.

 , ex 
 , ex

Fourth generation 

In 1969 a contract was signed in West Germany for two Type 209 submarines. The ships were of the /1,100-ton sub-type; they were built in parts by Howaldtswerke at Kiel and delivered to Tandanor shipyard in Buenos Aires where final assembly was completed in 1973. The vessels were commissioned in 1974, but only San Luis (S-32) was in service during the 1982 Falklands War. She reported two encounters with Royal Navy ships but without scoring hits due to problems with her torpedo's firing system. The threat posed by San Luis, however, forced the Royal Navy to give up recovery efforts of two Sea King helicopters which had ditched at sea on 12 May and 18 May 1982 respectively. Both aircraft were eventually destroyed by naval gunfire. She also tied up a considerable number of British naval assets deployed to counter her presence. There was an attempt to deploy Salta to the Falklands area at the end of May, but excessive noise and problems with the torpedo firing system similar to those found on San Luis prevented her operational use. San Luis was struck from the Navy in 1997 after an incomplete overhaul, whilst Salta (S-31) was still in service as of 2017. As of 2020 Salta was reported to be incapable of navigation.

Fifth generation 

As part of a major fleet renovation plan which included the MEKO frigates classes, a contract was signed in 1977 with West Germany's Nordseewerke for six s, the last four of them to be built in Argentina. The Argentine Navy sponsored the development of the CAREM nuclear reactor to be installed on these submarines, but for political reasons the whole program was cancelled and only the two German units were delivered. These ships were at the time the largest submarines built in Germany since World War II and are among the fastest diesel-electric submarines in the world.

  as of 2020, the refit of Santa Cruz was reported cancelled leaving the last boat in the fleet inactive.
  (Sunk. Presumed lost on 15 November 2017; wreck found on 16 November 2018)

References

Notes

Online sources 
 History section of official website
 Submarinos Argentinos at soldadosdigital.com

External links 
  
  History of Submarine force at Official site 
 Official Museum 
  Fuerza de Submarinos de la Armada Argentina at deyseg.com.ar
  Argentine submarines at elsnorkel.com

Naval units and formations of Argentina

Military units and formations of Argentina in the Falklands War
Mar del Plata
Military units and formations established in 1927